Kate Taylor may refer to:

 Kate Taylor (born 1949), folk singer and singer-songwriter
 Kate Taylor (album), her self-titled 1978 album
 Kate Taylor (British writer), sex columnist
 Kate Taylor (Canadian writer), novelist and journalist

See also
 Katie Taylor, Irish boxer
 Katy Taylor, American figure skater
 Catherine Taylor (disambiguation)